Arthur Betts may refer to:

 Arthur Betts (cricketer) (1880—1948), Australian cricketer
 Arthur Betts (footballer, born 1886) (d. 1967), English association footballer for Derby County and Watford
 Arthur Betts (footballer, born 1917) (d. 1978), professional footballer for Nottingham Forest F.C.